Lee Younggu (born 23 August 1987) is a Korean professional Go player.

An Younggil describes Younggu's style as very normal with few weak spots.

Promotion record

Career record
2006: 52 wins, 25 losses
2007: 70 wins, 33 losses
2008: 40 wins, 20 losses
2009: 32 wins, 20 losses
2010: 36 wins, 16 losses
2011: 27 wins, 8 losses

Titles and runners-up

Korean Baduk League

References

External links
 Korea Baduk Association profile (in Korean)

1987 births
Living people
South Korean Go players